Kharg Airport  is a regional airport located in city of Kharg, Bushehr Province, in southern Iran.

The airport is using by Iran Ministry of Petroleum for transferring of employees of Iran Oil Company by Karun Airlines and Mahan Air.

Airlines and destinations

References

Airports in Iran
Buildings and structures in Bushehr Province
Transportation in Bushehr Province